Henry Gibson (1935–2009) was an American actor.

Henry Gibson may also refer to:

 Henry R. Gibson (1837–1938), United States congressman
 Henry Gibson (percussionist) (1942–2002), American musician
 Henry Louis Gibson (1906–1992), American medical photographer

See also
 Gibson (surname) 
 Henrik Ibsen (1828–1906), Norwegian playwright, theatre director, and poet